Katharina Offel (born 31 July 1982) is a German equestrian who competed in showjumping for the Ukrainian team for the majority of her career.

References

Living people
1976 births
German female equestrians
Ukrainian female equestrians
Olympic equestrians of Ukraine
German emigrants to Ukraine
Equestrians at the 2008 Summer Olympics
Equestrians at the 2012 Summer Olympics
Naturalized citizens of Ukraine
People from Rosenheim
Sportspeople from Upper Bavaria